Elisa Vania Ravololoniaina (born 24 February 1992) is a Malagasy weightlifter.

She competed at the 2016 Summer Olympics in Rio de Janeiro, in the women's 63 kg, where she finished in 12th place.

References

1992 births
Living people
Malagasy female weightlifters
Olympic weightlifters of Madagascar
Weightlifters at the 2016 Summer Olympics
21st-century Malagasy people